NGC 4455 is a spiral galaxy located in the constellation of Coma Berenices at an approximate distance of 28.06 Mly. NGC 4455 was discovered in 1785 by William Herschel.

References

External links

NGC 4455 on SIMBAD

4455
Coma Berenices
Dwarf spiral galaxies
041066